Jerry Cotton is the fictional character in a series of pulp magazine-type crime novels. The novels have been written by many different writers in German-speaking countries and in Finland over the course of several decades.

Overview 
The novels center around the adventures of FBI agent Jerry Cotton, which take place in and around New York City. In 1954 the first novel appeared as no. 68: "Ich suchte den Gangster-Chef" (I Sought the Gang Boss) in the series "Bastei Kriminalroman". The pseudonym "Jerry Cotton" was developed in 1956 and the first novella with this name on the front page appeared with the title "Ich jagte den Diamanten-Hai" (I hunted the Diamond Shark). In 2014 the series reached the 3000th edition, "Goodbye New York!". Total circulation, about 930 million.

In Finnish versions of Jerry Cotton, he is said to have been born and raised on a farm in Harpersville, Connecticut. There is also some reference to his father having been a blacksmith or Jerry himself having been a blacksmith's apprentice before joining the police academy.

A group of over 100 authors write for the magazines, sold in many kiosks and over newsagents. Rolf Kalmuczak, who is the major author behind this name, made the TKKG series famous as Stefan Wolf.

One could summarise the motto of the series as "Crime without Sex", as women arise as characters only once in a while. Important figures of the series include, besides Cotton, his partner Phil Decker, FBI-chief John D. High, veteran agent Neville, Annie Geraldo, Zeerookah, June Clark, Roby O'Hara, Myrna, Windermeere and his Smith & Wesson, a 38 Caliber Smith & Wesson Special. Jerry Cotton drives a red Jaguar E-type, built in 1966.

Even though some people regard Jerry Cotton novels as trivial literature, the FBI agent has a faithful fan community (just like his equally long-lived science-fiction counterpart, Perry Rhodan). Several Jerry Cotton novels were adapted as radio plays.

One of the few official FBI pages in German states that Jerry Cotton indeed is a fictional agent and therefore it doesn't make sense to write fan-letters to him.

Authors
Prominent authors who admit cooperation with the Jerry Cotton series include:
 Heinz Werner Höber
 Thomas Jeier (= Christopher Ross)
 Rolf Kalmuczak (= Stefan Wolf, "TKKG")
 Walter Appel
 Martin Barkawitz
 Horst Friedrichs
 Friedrich Jankuba
 Jorg Layes
 Helmut Rellergert (= Jason Dark, "Geisterjäger John Sinclair")
 Friedrich Tenkrat
 Manfred Weinland

Jerry Cotton films 
Starting in the 1960s, a series of eight films based on the Cotton novels were made, the first four in black-and-white, the last four in color. The character of Jerry Cotton was played by American actor George Nader, and his companion Phil Decker was played by the German actor Heinz Weiß. The director of the films was Harald Reinl. The film's music was composed by Peter Thomas including the "Jerry Cotton March", that also was released on a soundtrack-single. In the 1990s the soundtracks of the movies were re-released on CDs.

The bracketed links refer to the pages at IMDb.
 Mordnacht in Manhattan / Manhattan Night of Murder (1965) (b/w)
 Schüsse aus dem Geigengasten (1965) (b/w)
 Die Rechnung – eiskalt serviert (1966) (b/w)
 The Trap Snaps Shut at Midnight (1966) (b/w)
 Der Mörderclub von Brooklyn (1967)
 Tod im Roten Jaguar (1968)
 Dynamit in grüner Seide (1968)
 Todesschüsse am Broadway (1969)

In 2007 Constantin Film AG and Rat Pack Filmproduktion released a new German feature film titled Jerry Cotton, directed by Cyrill Boss and Philipp Stennert, starring Christian Tramitz as the protagonist, Christian Ulmen (as Phil Decker), Mónica Cruz as the leading lady and Christiane Paul, Heino Ferch and Moritz Bleibtreu as their counterparts. The film met general expectations by gaining a lot of new attention for Jerry Cotton and the classic series of novels of the same name.

See also
FBI portrayal in media

References

External links 
 Bastei publishing house  with detailed Jerry Cotton pages (German)
 Page at German TV-station 3Sat "Jerry Cotton investigating" (German)
 cotton forum.de/InterNet Site of the Jerry Cotton forum (German)
 Jerry Cotton-soundtracks (English)
 Official Site from the Movie "Jerry Cotton" (German)

Book series introduced in 1954
Literary characters introduced in 1954
Film series introduced in 1965
Characters in German novels of the 20th century
Characters in crime novel series
German film series
Fictional Federal Bureau of Investigation personnel
Fictional characters from New York City
House names